Muskingum River Power Plant was a 1.5-gigawatt (1,529 MW) coal power plant, owned and operated by American Electric Power (AEP). At its peak, the plant powered three million households. The plant operated from 1953 until ceasing generation in 2015.

Units
Four out of five plant's units were among the oldest in the United States:

Units 1–4 discharged their waste heat (about twice their combined electrical output) into Muskingum River.

Closure and demolition
As a cost-cutting measure, AEP idled one of the units at Muskingum River in 2010.

Originally slated to be converted to run on natural gas, Muskingum River closed entirely due to environmental regulations and market conditions at a cost of $150 million to $170 million. Ohio's power consumption was noted as being "flat." The original proposal called for Units 1–4 to be shuttered by December 31, 2014, and Unit 5 to be converted to natural gas. Unit 5 closed on May 31, 2015, with 150 workers laid off.

AEP sold the site to Commercial Liability Partners in September 2015 to repurpose the brownfields for future redevelopment. Adamo was contracted to demolish the Muskingum River. Demolition was completed in June 2018 following the implosion of the plant's remaining two smokestacks. In January 2021, the site was sold to the Southeastern Ohio Port Authority, who is continuing the repurposing and redevelopment process.

Accidents and Incidents

Hydrogen explosion
On January 8, 2007, a hydrogen supply truck was making its routine weekly delivery of dihydrogen (H2) gas to the station's hydrogen system, when an explosion occurred at 9:20 a.m. The truck driver was killed in the accident, and ten other people were injured. Premature failure of the pressure—relief device's rupture disc was blamed.

Two civil trials in 2011, however, essentially rejected AEP's claims that rupture discs and a third party contractor were to blame.  The juries determined that AEP had acted with "deliberate intent" toward its own employee, Drumand McLaughlin, and with "conscious disregard" for the rights of the truck driver, Lewis Timmons, who was killed.  A total of almost $13 million was assessed in damages as of August 29, 2011, including punitive damages to punish AEP subsidiaries Ohio Power Company and American Electric Power Service Corporation for their misconduct in failing to maintain the hydrogen systems.  The companies were also to be assessed attorney's fees.

Demolition accident
On December 2, 2015, during the dismantling of a conveyor belt over a waterway, the housing for the belt line failed. One worker was killed and another was injured. Occupational Safety and Health Administration (OSHA) cited Adamo on four serious violations.

See also

 List of power stations in Ohio

References

Energy infrastructure completed in 1953
Energy infrastructure completed in 1954
Energy infrastructure completed in 1957
Energy infrastructure completed in 1958
Energy infrastructure completed in 1968
Former coal-fired power stations in Ohio
Buildings and structures in Washington County, Ohio
1953 establishments in Ohio
2015 disestablishments in Ohio
Buildings and structures demolished in 2018
American Electric Power